Anna Blundy (born 11 April 1970) is an English novelist and journalist. She was born in London and educated at the City of London School for Girls and Westminster School.  Her first book was published in 1998: Every Time We Say Goodbye, a memoir of her father David Blundy, a foreign correspondent killed in El Salvador in 1989. Her series of novels featuring the female war correspondent Faith Zanetti started with The Bad News Bible in 2004. The second in a series, Faith Without Doubt, was published in  September 2005. The third in the series, Neat Vodka was published in September 2006 by Little, Brown.

Anna Blundy studied Russian at University College, Oxford. She is a columnist for The Times and was its Moscow Bureau Chief during the 1998–99 financial crisis. She has  appeared since 2006 on BBC Television's Newsnight Review and its successor The Review Show.

Books
Every Time We Say Goodbye
Oligarch's Wife

Faith Zanetti novels
Bad News Bible
Faith Without Doubt
Neat Vodka
Double Shot, US title: Breaking Faith
My Favourite Poison

References

External links 

 Proper Advice from a Psychoanalytic Viewpoint blog
 
 Life of the Mind & other Articles by Anna Blundy at Prospect Magazine

1970 births
Living people
British memoirists
English women novelists
English women journalists
The Times people
BBC people
Alumni of University College, Oxford
People educated at Westminster School, London
People educated at the City of London School for Girls
British women memoirists
21st-century English writers
21st-century British novelists
21st-century English women writers
English women non-fiction writers
21st-century memoirists